The 2006-07 season was Newcastle Jets' second season in the Hyundai A-League. After a poor start to the season, The Jets finished strongly to place 3rd at the conclusion of the regular season. They beat Sydney FC in the minor Semi-Final but lost to Adelaide United in the Preliminary Final on penalties.

Players

First team squad

Transfers

In

Out

Matches

2006-07 Pre-Season Cup

2006-07 Hyundai A-League fixtures

2006-07 Finals series

Points table

Statistics

Goal scorers

References

Newcastle Jets FC seasons
Newcastle Jets Season, 2006-07